WSS may refer to:

Computing
 WebSideStory, a web analytics company
 Windows Sound System
 Windows SharePoint Services
 WS-Security (meaning Web Services Security)
 wss://, the prefix used to indicate secured WebSocket protocol in an URI

Schools
 Westdale Secondary School, a public high school in Hamilton, Ontario
 Whitley Secondary School, a secondary school in Bishan, Singapore

Societies
 Western Shugden Society
 World Ship Society

Technology
 Wavelength Selective Switching
 Widescreen signaling

Other uses
 Warehouse shoe sale, a retail chain of shoe stores
 Weekly Shōnen Sunday, a Japanese manga magazine
 Wide sense stationary
 Winston-Salem Southbound Railway
 World Schools Style debate, a competitive debating format
 Working Set Size
 While She Sleeps, a metalcore band from Sheffield, England
 White spot syndrome, white spot disease in shrimps
 War of the Spanish Succession, shortcut used in wargaming community